Project Valhalla may refer to:
 Project Valhalla (Java language), a project to develop new features for the Java programming language
 Project Valhalla, a fictional project in Max Payne (video game)